Wolf Hunting is a novel in the Firekeeper Saga series by Jane Lindskold.

Series
Other books in the series are:
 Through Wolf's Eyes (2001)
 Wolf's Head, Wolf's Heart (2002)
 The Dragon of Despair (2003)
 Wolf Captured (2004)
 Wolf Hunting (2006)
 Wolf's Blood (2007)
 Wolf's Search (2019)

Reception 
Barbara Riley reviewed the novel for The Santa Fe New Mexican, praising its characters and Lindskold's writing.

References

2006 American novels
2006 fantasy novels
American fantasy novels
Tor Books books
Novels by Jane Lindskold